This list of 2014 motorsport champions is a list of national or international motorsport series with championships decided by the points or positions earned by a driver from multiple races where the season was completed during the 2014 calendar year.

Open wheel racing

Sports car and GT

Stock car racing

Touring car racing

Rallying

Drifting

Truck racing

Motorcycles

Road racing

Air racing

Water surface racing

Outboard powerboat racing

Radio-controlled racing

1:8 On-Road

1:10 Off-Road

1:10 Electric Touring Car

1:8 Off-Road

1:12 On-Road

1:10 200mm Nitro Touring Car

1:5 Large Scale On-Road

See also
 List of motorsport championships

References

 Champions
Motorsport champions
2014